Sir Anthony Herbert Grabham (19 July 1930 – 21 February 2015) was a British surgeon and British Army officer, who was active in medical politics. He was Chairman of the British Medical Association in the late 1970s to early 1980s, and was a member of the General Medical Council for twenty years.

Early life
Grabham was born on 19 July 1930 in Newcastle-Upon-Tyne, England. His father was a police inspector and his grandfather was a firefighter who was head of the fire brigades of North East England.

Career

Military service
In 1954, Grabham began a period of National Service with the British Army. He was commissioned into the Royal Army Medical Corps as a lieutenant on 25 April 1954. He was promoted to captain on 3 August 1955. On 14 August 1956, he was transferred to the Territorial Army and granted the rank of captain with seniority from 3 August 1955. On 6 June 1957, he was transferred to the Army Emergency Reserve of Officers, thereby ending his military service.

During his military service, he served as a Regimental Medical Officer. He completed two overseas posting: one to Celle, West Germany, and the other to Derna, Libya.

Medical career
Graham became a general surgeon at the age of 34 years, who also wrote on medico-politics for the British Medical Journal. He qualified from Royal Victoria Infirmary in Newcastle upon Tyne. On returning from Libya as a medical officer, he took up a surgical post in kettering.

Honours
In the 1988 New Year Honours, it was announced that Grabham had been appointed a Knight Bachelor and therefore granted the title sir. On 9 February 1988, he was knighted at Buckingham Palace by Queen Elizabeth II.

References

1930 births
2015 deaths
British surgeons
Knights Bachelor
Royal Army Medical Corps officers
People from Newcastle upon Tyne
Place of death missing